E. S. Bijimol is a politician and ex Member of Kerala Legislative Assembly from Peerumedu constituency, Idukki.

Life
She belongs to the Communist Party of India. She is one of the State Council members of Communist Party of India. She was born in Upputhara on 13 January 1972. She is the daughter of George and Annamma. She is working as a teacher as well as a political worker. She is an Executive Member of National Federation of Indian Women. In the year 1995 she was elected as the Block Panchayath President of Azhutha and she was holding the post until 2000 and she also served as a District Panchayath Member from 2005 September to 2006 April. Her participation in protest of Mullapperiyar Dam issue was highlighted by all the media.

References

External links

Malayali politicians
People from Idukki district
Living people
1972 births
Communist Party of India politicians from Kerala
Kerala MLAs 2011–2016
Kerala MLAs 2016–2021
20th-century Indian women politicians
20th-century Indian politicians
21st-century Indian women politicians
21st-century Indian politicians
Women members of the Kerala Legislative Assembly